The City of Geelong was a local government area about  southwest of Melbourne, the state capital of Victoria, Australia.

History

Geelong was the second municipality in Victoria, after the City of Melbourne. It was established under the Geelong Incorporation Act (NSW) in October 1849, and proclaimed as a town on 4 June 1858. On 8 December 1910, it was proclaimed a city.

On 18 May 1993, the City of Geelong was abolished, and along with the Cities of Geelong West and Newtown, the Rural City of Bellarine, the Shire of Corio and parts of the City of South Barwon and the Shires of Barrabool and Bannockburn, was merged into the newly created City of Greater Geelong.

Wards

The City of Geelong was divided into five wards, each of which elected three councillors:
 Barwon Ward
 Bellarine Ward
 Fidge Ward
 Kardinia Ward
 Ormond Ward

Geography

The city consisted of two parts. The main section, which included Geelong City, Breakwater, East Geelong and South Geelong, was bounded by Corio Bay to the northeast, Barwon River to the southeast, Boundary Road to the east and La Trobe Terrace to the west.

An additional section further to the north, between Victoria Street, Bell Parade and Thomson Road, included the suburb of Rippleside and part of Geelong North.

Population

* Estimate in the 1958 Victorian Year Book.

References

External links
 Victorian Places - Geelong

Geelong City
1849 establishments in Australia
City of Greater Geelong
1993 disestablishments in Australia